Adelita Husni-Bey (born 1985) is a visual artist best known for her films and installations.

Early life and education 
Husni-Bey received a BA in Fine Art from the Chelsea College of Art and Design in London in 2007 and she graduated with an MA in Photography and Uran Cultures from Goldsmiths University in 2009. In 2010, she was selected for the Advanced Course in Visual Art at the Fondazione Antonio Ratti, Como in Italy under visiting professor Hans Haacke. Between 2012 and 2013, Husni-Bey was a fellow researcher for the Independent Study Program at the Whitney Museum of American Art.

Career 

Adelita Husni-Bey's work focuses on complex questions about gender, race and class using collectivist and informal pedagogical models within the framework of urban studies. Her practice involves the analysis and counter-representation of the hegemonic ideology in Western society. Practicing as both an artist and a pedagogue she activates creative processes, such as role-playing, group undertakings and workshops with students, athletes, lawyers, activists and architects. As part of her methodology, she sets up situations and experiments where her collaborators understand their own relationship to the social and economic power of our present times.

In the film Postcards from the Desert Island (2011)

the artist documents a three week workshop with children from an experimental, self-run elementary public school in Paris, École Vitruve. The school was created in 1962 with the aim of experimenting with educational models based on co-operation and non-competitiveness. To test the potentiality of radical education, Husni-Bey, inspired by the novel Lord of the Flies (1963) by William Golding, asked a group of children aged between seven and ten years, to imagine their school's hall as a desert island and to relate themselves to the new territory. The film documents how the group of children organize and how they relate to problems and imagine a life without institutions or control, and where to draw the distinction between public and private.

The work White Paper (2014 - ongoing) consists of an ongoing research into the relationship between the notion of property, legislation, and the right to housing under capitalism. It focuses on three countries: Egypt, The Netherlands and Spain. The first chapter White Paper: The Land (2014) was presented in Cairo at Beirut (art space). It consists of a video-installation focused on the land rights of people affected by the mega-urban development Cairo 2050, a government-backed and privately funded metropolitan development plan of massive proportions, which threatens the livelihood of many informal settlements such as the neighbourhood of Gezirat al-Qursaya and Ramlet Boulaq. The second chapter White Paper: The Law (2015) was supported by Casco (Utrecht) and it resulted in a legal document, the Convention on the Use of Space. The document was written through a series of public drafting meetings across the Netherlands in collaboration with squatters, lawyers, housing rights activists, tenants associations and the general public. For the last chapter of the project White Paper: The Imaginery (2016) the Convention travelled to Spain, to Móstoles neighbourhood in Madrid and it was hosted by CA2M. The project was carried on in various independent spaces and squatted social centres, where a number of public meetings were held to draw up the Spanish version of the text. The project is documented by a book, White Paper On Land, law And The Imaginary edited by Antonia Alampi, Binna Choi, Jens Maier-Rothe, Pablo Martínez.

The Reading / La Seduta, was presented at the Italian Pavilion, curated by Cecilia Alemani, at the 2017 Venice Biennale. The artist organized a workshop in Mannahatta (Lenape territory, known as Manhattan, New York) with a group of youngsters which consisted of meetings, discussions and theatre exercises inspired by the Theater of the Oppressed. The activities were focused on participants' connection to the environment and to the exploitation of the earth in relation to complex topics such as technology, use, value, threat and vulnerability. The workshops resulted in a film where the artist designed a tarot deck which was used as a performative device and an excuse as well for participants to talk about their own spiritual, colonial, and technological relationships to the earth and land. The installation was accompanied by a series of sculptures representing luminescent silicone hands.

Exhibitions

Solo exhibitions 
 2019 Adelita Husni Bey: Chiron, New Museum, New York
2017 Adelita Husni Bey - Four Films curated by Lucia Pietroiusti for Serpentine Cinema, Peckhamplex, London
 2017 Il Mondo Magico, curated by Cecilia Alemani, national representation, Italian Pavilion, 57th Venice Biennale
 2017 2265, Miller Contemporary, New York
 2017 Libro blanco: la tierra, la ley y el imaginario, curated by Pablo Martínez, CA2M, Madrid
 2016 A Wave in the Well, curated by Nora Raizan, Sursock Museum, Beirut The Classroom, Ex-Montessori school, Milan
 2015 Movement Break, Kadist Art Foundation, San Francisco
 2015 White Paper Chapter II, Casco, (Office for Design Art and Theory) Utrecht
 2014 Il Principe, la Classe e lo Stato, Laveronica arte contemporanea, Modica, Sicily Agency – giochi di potere, NCTM e l’arte, Studio Legale NCTM, Milano
 2014 White Paper: The Land (chapter I), Beirut, Cairo, Egypt
 2014 Opening, solo stand at ARCO artfair, Madrid
 2013 Present Future, solo stand at Artissima, Artfair, Turin
 2012 Playing Truant curated by Robert Leckie, Gasworks, London.
 2012 Clays Lane Live Archive curated by Shama Khanna, Supplement Gallery, London.
 2011 La Montagna Verde. Dove? Nel Deserto. Per Dove? Verso il Nulla, curated by Gabi Scardi, Viafarini-CareOf, Milan.
 2011 Lethe, curated by Riccardo Lisi in various venues between Como, Porlezza and Dongo.
 2010 DeadMouth, curated by Bruna Roccasalva, Laveronica Arte Contemporanea, Modica.

Prizes and nominations 
In 2016, Husni-Bey was the recipient of the Illy Prize for artists under 35 at the 16th Rome Quadriennale. 

In 2013, she was nominated for the Furla Foundation prize. 

In 2012, she won the Victor Pinchuk Foundation award in Kyiv (Ukraine), and she was awarded of the Young Collector’s Prize at the Rome Artfair, resulting in the acquisition of her work by the MAXXI Museum in Rome. 

In 2011 Husni-Bey won the Euromobil Bologna Artfair prize as ‘Best artist under 30’.

References

External links 
 Go behind the scenes with The Council Being: New Photography 2018
 Interview with teen participants in Adelita Husni-Bey's The Council MoMA Audio: Being: New Photography 2018
 Laveronica Gallery
 Supplement Gallery
 Serpentine Cinema: Adelita Husni-Bey, Four Films
 Il Mondo Magico - Italian Pavilion at the 57th Venice Art Biennial
 CA2M
 Sursock Museum
 Kadist Foundation - San Francisco
 White Paper: The Law
 White Paper: The Land
 Convention on the Use of Space
 Gasworks
 Viafarini
 MAXXI Award 2016

1985 births
Living people
21st-century Italian women artists
Italian contemporary artists
Alumni of Chelsea College of Arts 
Alumni of Goldsmiths, University of London